Morena Son are a Cuban son septeto from Santiago de Cuba, Cuba. They have toured South America and Europe (Italy, England, Germany, Switzerland, Spain and France).

Members
Aimeé Campos – tres
Aylen Guevara – vocals
María Mercedes Soto – percussion, vocals
Juana Filiú – bass
Niurka Cardona – vocals, maracas
Orialis Luna – guitar
Deisy Estrada – bongos

References

Son cubano groups
Cuban musical groups
All-female bands